Peperomia zarzalana is a herb species of plant from the genus Peperomia. It was described by William Trelease and Truman G. Yuncker in 1922.   In Colombia, its elevation range is about 680-1100 Meters.

Departments 

Colombian Department : 

 Antioquia
 Cundinamarca
 Huila
 Norte de Santander
 Putumayo
 Santander
 Tolima
 Valle del Cauca

References

zarzalana
Flora of South America
Flora of Colombia
Flora of Ecuador
Flora of Venezuela
Plants described in 1922
Taxa named by William Trelease
Taxa named by Truman G. Yuncker